Adam Trenčan (born July 10, 1990)  is a Slovak professional ice hockey goaltender for the HKM Zvolen of the Slovak Extraliga.

Career statistics

Regular season and playoffs

References

External links

 

Living people
HC Slezan Opava players
HC 07 Detva players
HK 36 Skalica players
HC Oceláři Třinec players
HC Benátky nad Jizerou players
HK Spišská Nová Ves players
Lausitzer Füchse players
HK Nitra players
HK Dukla Michalovce players
HKM Zvolen players
1990 births
Slovak ice hockey goaltenders
Sportspeople from Banská Bystrica
Slovak expatriate ice hockey players in Germany
Slovak expatriate ice hockey players in the Czech Republic